Red Abbott was a band whose members were based in New York City, Boston, Massachusetts, and Portland, Maine. They created electronic rock by emailing elements of songs to each other. Their debut album, Having Fun Without You, was released in 2007.

History 
Bert Brown, Chip Means and Joe Madera formed Red Abbott in 2006. Although they operated Red Abbott from three remote cities, the band's members all grew up in the Boston area and originally met in high school.

Using home recording equipment, Brown, Means and Madera set to work emailing pieces of songs back and forth until they had completed their debut, Having Fun Without You. The process of editing the album's 12 tracks took eighteen months to complete. The band has noted in interviews that electronic rock band The Postal Service used a similar technique involving standard mail for their 2003 album Give Up.

Shortly after the album's release, the band played its first and only live concert, joined by former Radka drummer Shawn Hildonen.

The band has received considerable media attention for its email-only approach to songwriting and recording. Popular Mechanics featured the band in a series of stories on artists who use consumer electronics to create professional work. MTV in the United Kingdom picked up the band's music video for "The Spare Room," created by Brown, and included it in rotation on the program 120 Minutes.

Discography 
Having Fun Without You (2007), self-released through Broken Treehouse Music

Members 
Bert Brown - vocals, drums, synths, programming, bass
Chip Means - vocals, guitars, bass, flute, keyboard, percussion
Joe Madera - vocals, keyboards, bass, guitars, percussion

References

External links 
 Official Web site
 Myspace page for Red Abbott
 Performer Magazine album review June 2008

Musical groups from Boston
Musical groups from Maine
Musical groups from Portland, Maine